Robert Connolly (born 1967) is an Australian film director, producer and screenwriter based in Melbourne, Victoria. He is best known as the director and writer of the feature films Balibo, Three Dollars and The Bank, and the producer of Romulus, My Father and The Boys. He is head of the film distribution company, Footprint Films, owned by Arenafilms.

Early life and education
Connolly was born in 1967. Along with David Wenham, he worked in theatre before transitioning to filmmaking. They were both involved in a production of The Boys at the Griffin Theatre Company in Sydney. Connolly graduated from the Australian Film, Television and Radio School (AFTRS) in the late 1990s, where he undertook a three-year course that included directing.

Career
Connolly made his first feature film as producer, The Boys in 1998, which had its world premiere in competition at the Berlin International Film Festival.  His first film as director, The Bank, was produced by his former mentor and later business partner at Arenafilm John Maynard.

In 2007 Connolly and Maynard together produced the period immigration drama Romulus, My Father, directed by Richard Roxburgh, starring Eric Bana and Franka Potente.

By 2013, he had written and directed four feature films and produced around 12 others, as well as doing work for television.

He directed and produced Paper Planes (2014) and The Dry (2020), and has been nominated for or won numerous Australian and international awards (see lists below).

Balibo
In 2009, Connolly directed Balibo, which he co-wrote with David Williamson.  The film examines the politically fraught deaths of Australian-based journalists the Balibo Five and Roger East during the Indonesian invasion of East Timor in 1975.  Maynard produced the film, which starred Anthony LaPaglia in the lead role of East. Balibo was the first feature to be shot in East Timor.<

Indonesia continues to maintain that the Balibo Five died accidentally in crossfire as its troops battled East Timorese Fretilin rebels, a version of events accepted by successive Australian governments. But the film depicts the young journalists, who were working for Australian TV networks and presumed their nationality afforded them protection, being slaughtered on the orders of Indonesian military chiefs to prevent news of the invasion reaching the world.

Connolly refuses to apologise for his film's hardline stance, stating that an Australian coroner found in 2007 that the journalists were executed as they tried to surrender to Indonesian forces. He said: "It's quite clear the journalists were murdered... The current Indonesian and Australian (Government) point of view that they were killed in crossfire is quite frankly absurd. I'd imagine the film will be confronting because it represents something contrary to the official view." He points out that the East Timorese Truth and Reconciliation Commission found that up to 183,000 East Timorese people died as a result of the conflict, when the total population was only around 600,000, while both the Australian Government under the Liberals and the opposition Labor Party were focused on oil and gas resources and regional influence.

Themes and views
Connolly has been definitive about his political approach to filmmaking, saying "Without a doubt, in recent times, the political agenda of the work is what drives us. We feel a responsibility to use cinema to put a blow torch to contemporary Australia and contribute to some discussion or debate about where we're headed. That's what I find most rewarding about it." Three Dollars (2005), The Bank (2001) and The Boys (1998) all have a strong political agenda, and have been released in Australia as a DVD box set along with the documentary The Political Arena, which explores the social and political strands of the films.

In 2008, Connolly published a white paper outlining his views on all that could be improved about the Australian film industry, which includes a ten-step plan for reducing production costs.

Arenafilm and Footprint Films

Arenafilm was first incorporated in 1987 by film producer John Maynard and produced The Navigator: A Medieval Odyssey (1988) and  Jane Campion's film s Sweetie (1989) and An Angel at My Table (1990) (with Maynard's partner Bridget Ikin). The company went on to produce The Boys (1998) and several other of Connolly's films, including Balibo. Its history is not clear, but Connolly and Maynard became directors of the company during the 2000s. Connolly relocated to set up the Arenafilm Melbourne office in late 2006 (including Arenamedia) and subsidiary companies.

Footprint Films is the film distribution company owned by Arenafilm. Maynard had earlier had a production company called Footstep Films. In December 2007, Film Victoria provided  of funding to be shared among Footprint and two other companies.

In 2009, Footprint Films was the Australasian distributor for Balibo and Sarah Watt's My Year Without Sex (both made by Arenafilm), and in the same year, it expanded its operations to acquire and release third-party films. Its first two distribution-only films were Warwick Thornton's Samson and Delilah, and Kriv Stenders' Lucky Country (film). The physical work of distributing is handled by Transmission Films, headed by Richard Payten and Andrew Mackie and backed by Paramount Pictures Australia. Connolly believes that it is healthy for filmmakers to become involved in distribution.

Recognition and awards
The Boys was nominated for 13 AFI Awards including Best Film, and won awards for Best Director, Best Adapted Screenplay, Best Supporting Actor and Best Supporting Actress. In 1998, Connolly was named by Variety as one of the 10 best emerging producers in the world.

Connolly has screened his films at over 30 international film festivals, including the Toronto International Film Festival and San Sebastian Film Festival. He received a Centenary Medal for services to the Australian Film Industry in 2001.

Romulus, My Father won four Australian Film Institute Awards (AFI) including Best Film, and Connolly has also garnered AFI Awards for writing The Bank and Three Dollars.

Matthew Campora, head of screen studies at AFTRS, wrote in 2013 that Connolly was "a director who could be considered amongst the most successful contemporary filmmakers working in Australia today", and "Connolly’s films combine characteristics of the Hollywood thriller with archetypal Australian character types and narrative arcs to create a body of films that continue a particular style of filmmaking identified by [Graeme] Turner in the 1990s".

Other roles
In 2008 Connolly was appointed to the inaugural board of Screen Australia. His term ended on 30 June 2011.

He also served on the boards of the New South Wales Film and Television Office (FTO, predecessor to Screen NSW) and the Australian Directors Guild, as well as the University of New South Wales Dean's Council.

In 2011 Connolly worked on and influenced the development of the unreleased videogame Warco, that could be used to train journalists to work and report in war-torn regions.

Filmography

Film

Television

Footnotes

References

External links 
 

1967 births
Living people
Australian film directors
Recipients of the Centenary Medal